Mark or Marc Campbell may refer to:
Mark Campbell (defensive tackle) (born 1972), American football player
Mark Campbell (tight end) (born 1975), American football player
Mark Campbell (footballer) (born 1978), Scottish footballer
Mark Campbell (political consultant), former college administrator and former Republican political strategist
Mark Mitchell Campbell (1897–1963), barnstormer and stuntman
Mark Campbell (librettist), librettist
Mark Campbell (basketball), American basketball coach
Marc Campbell (1884–1946), shortstop in Major League Baseball
Marc Campbell, lead singer and guitarist for The Nails

See also
Marcus Campbell (disambiguation)